Honoré Jacquinot (1 August 1815 in Moulins-Engilbert - 22 May 1887 in Nevers) was a French surgeon and zoologist. Jacquinot was the younger brother of the naval officer Charles Hector Jacquinot, and sailed with him as a surgeon and naturalist on La Zelée on Dumont d'Urville's Astrolabe expedition (1837–1840).

With J. B. Hombron, while en route to the Antarctic and anchored off the coast of New Zealand, he was able to describe and illustrate 15 species of molluscs found in those waters, plus several species of fish and crustacea.

See also
 European and American voyages of scientific exploration

References

French ornithologists
French zoologists
French herpetologists
1815 births
1887 deaths
People from Nièvre